Klochki is the name of several rural localities and villages in Russia:
Klochki, Altai Krai, a selo in Klochkovsky Selsoviet of Rebrikhinsky District of Altai Krai
Klochki, Kirov Oblast, a village in Kugalsky Rural Okrug of Yaransky District of Kirov Oblast
Klochki, Tambov Oblast, a village in Sestrenovsky Selsoviet of Petrovsky District of Tambov Oblast